Claudiu Nicu Răducanu (born 3 December 1976) is a Romanian former footballer who played as a striker.

Club career
Claudiu Răducanu was born in Craiova on 3 December 1976 and started playing football at the youth centers of Universitatea Craiova and CSȘ Craiova. He made his Divizia A debut on 24 September 1994, playing for Electroputere Craiova in a 4–0 loss against Inter Sibiu. He was transferred by Steaua București for 150.000$ in 2000 where he managed to help the team win one title, one supercup and become the 2002–03 Divizia A top goalscorer with 21 goals, also he scored two goals in both legs of the 2003–04 UEFA Cup first round when Steaua defeated Southampton 2–1 on aggregate, and one goal in the first leg of the following round when Steaua lost 2–1 on aggregate against Liverpool. In 2004 Espanyol Barcelona paid Steaua 1.3 million€ for his transfer. At Espanyol he is best remembered after scoring the victory goal in the 89th minute of his Primera División debut, a 1–0 against Villarreal and at the end of the game he threw his shirt to the stand where the team's fans where staying, but as a lot of them tried to grab it, the railing broke and they fell on the ground.  He also scored two goals in a 3–2 victory against Atlético Madrid, having a total of three goals scored in 11 Primera División matches. He went to play for Arminia Bielefeld, making 5 appearances without scoring in Bundesliga. In his following years, Răducanu became a journeyman, playing for various teams and leagues from Romania and worldwide.

International career
Claudiu Răducanu played two friendly games for Romania, making his debut on 30 April 2003 under coach Anghel Iordănescu in a 1–0 victory against Lithuania. His second game was a 1–0 loss against Italy.

Controversy
In October 2014, Răducanu was arrested for the use of fake credit cards and for trying to bribe a police officer in Cancun, Mexico, spending one month and a half in jail.

Honours

Club
Extensiv Craiova
Divizia B: 1998–99
Steaua București
Divizia A: 2000–01
Supercupa României: 2001

Individual
Divizia A top scorer: 2002–03

References

External links

Living people
1976 births
Association football forwards
Romanian footballers
Sportspeople from Craiova
FC Caracal (2004) players
FC Steaua București players
RCD Espanyol footballers
Arminia Bielefeld players
FC Vaslui players
Guangzhou F.C. players
Nea Salamis Famagusta FC players
A.S.D. Sorrento players
FC Universitatea Cluj players
Khazar Lankaran FK players
CF Gavà players
CE Premià players
PSM Makassar players
F.C. Romania players
Liga I players
Liga II players
La Liga players
Bundesliga players
China League One players
Cypriot First Division players
Serie C players
Azerbaijan Premier League players
Segunda División B players
Tercera División players
Indonesian Premier League players
Romanian expatriate footballers
Romania international footballers
Expatriate footballers in Spain
Romanian expatriate sportspeople in Spain
Expatriate footballers in Germany
Romanian expatriate sportspeople in Germany
Expatriate footballers in China
Romanian expatriate sportspeople in China
Expatriate footballers in Cyprus
Romanian expatriate sportspeople in Cyprus
Expatriate footballers in Italy
Romanian expatriate sportspeople in Italy
Expatriate footballers in Azerbaijan
Romanian expatriate sportspeople in Azerbaijan
Expatriate footballers in Indonesia
Romanian expatriate sportspeople in Indonesia
Expatriate footballers in England
Romanian expatriate sportspeople in England